Sally-Ann Roberts is an American broadcaster. She worked for 40 years in news television before retiring in 2018.

Early life and career
Sally-Ann Roberts was born in Chandler, Arizona, the daughter of Lawrence and Lucimarian Roberts. Her father was a colonel in the Air Force and was one of the Tuskegee Airmen. She graduated in 1974 from the University of Southern Mississippi.

Broadcaster
She was hired as a member of the news team at WWL-TV in New Orleans, Louisiana, on March 31, 1977, and co-anchored the Eyewitness Morning News with Eric Paulsen. She retired in 2018.

Author
She is the author of Going Live: An Anchorwoman Reports Good News.  With a foreword by her sister Robin Roberts, and photographs by her news colleague Eric Paulsen, Roberts authored an inspirational book, Your Power is On!: A Little Book of Hope.

In addition to these non-fiction books, Roberts authored the novel Angel Vision. She gives motivational speeches around the United States.

Personal life
She is the older sister of Robin Roberts, a co-anchor of ABC's Good Morning America.

Books
 Going Live: An Anchorwoman Reports Good News. Gretna, La.: Pelican Publishing Co., 1998. 
 Angel Vision. Gretna, La.: Pelican Publishing Co., 2002. 
 Your Power Is On!: A Little Book Of Hope. Pelican Publishing Co., 2013.

References

Television anchors from New Orleans
New Orleans television reporters
University of Southern Mississippi alumni
Living people
People from Chandler, Arizona
1953 births